Blue Tea Games is a casual computer games development studio, founded on January 24, 2003 by Steven Zhao.

Blue Tea Games
Blue Tea Games's works are usually released through digital and online casual game distributor Big Fish Games where the company enjoys critical acclaim and success through their Dark Parables series.

A typical Dark Parables game is a puzzle- and FROG-driven retelling of a popular fairy tale. A FROG (Fragmented Object Game) involves searching for fragmented parts of an object within a scene. Once all are located, the fragments self-assemble into a working object that can be used in a puzzle elsewhere in accordance with the narrative story.

Blue Tea Games launched a new series Macabre Mysteries in 2011 with a focus on the supernatural/horror aspect of an urban mystery. The company's biggest commercial success in 2007 was Forgotten Riddles: The Mayan Princess, which reached #1 on the Big Fish Games portal.

Games
Ballmaster (2002)
HeliumMan-X (2002)
Meeklits (2003)
Ballmaster 2 (2003)
Cactus Bruce and the Corporate Monkeys (2004)
Teddy Tavern: A Culinary Adventure (2007)
Forgotten Lands: First Colony (2008)
Macabre Mysteries: Curse of the Nightingale (2011)
Fabled Legends: The Dark Piper (2012)
Enchantia: Wrath of the Phoenix Queen (2013)
Cursery: The Crooked Man and The Crooked Cat (2013)
Mavenfall (2015)

Forgotten Riddles series
Forgotten Riddles: The Mayan Princess (2007)
The Mayan Princess is a HOG (hidden object game) that features a story, set during the 16th century, around the fate of a Mayan royal family.

As part of game play, a list of items for the player to find is usually presented in form of a riddle. For example, "You'll find I mark time with no tick and no tock; It's with sand that I mimic a modern day clock". The player will eventually realise it refers to an hourglass, which can be taken as a clue to advance through the game. According to a GameZebo interview, Interface Design Artist Shawn Seil had created exactly 1,500 riddles for this game.
Forgotten Riddles: The Moonlight Sonatas (2008)

Dark Parables series
Dark Parables is a franchise of several games involving fairy tales. Only the first 7 games in the series are created by Blue Tea Games.  The franchise was then further developed by Eipix Entertainment. During the production of Return of the Salt Princess that Blue Tea Games returned to the series. Starting with Rise of the Snow Queen, the series included small bonus games that expanded the lore.

Enlightenus series
Enlightenus (2009)
Enlightenus II: The Timeless Tower (2010)

References

External links
 BlueTeaGames.com

Video game development companies